The 12th Pan American Games were held in Mar del Plata, Argentina from March 11 to March 26, 1995. Antigua and Barbuda competed for the fifth time at the Pan American Games, winning its first ever medal.

Medals

Bronze

Women's 100 metres: Heather Samuel

Results by event

See also
Antigua and Barbuda at the 1996 Summer Olympics

References

Nations at the 1995 Pan American Games
Pan American Games
1995